Angie Chen Button (born February 9, 1954) is a Certified Public Accountant and a retired marketing manager of Texas Instruments from Garland, Texas, who is a Republican member of the Texas House of Representatives. Since 2009, she has represented District 112 in Dallas County.

Background

Before Button was born, the Chinese Communist Party (CCP) took control in China, and Button's parents chose to flee to Taiwan. The family of 7  lived in a 300-square foot, one-room hut without a bathroom or a kitchen. The Chen's were one of the few Christian families in their small village.

In 2021 following the 87th session, Button was named as one of Texas Monthly's Best Legislators.

Political life
Button is one of the few legislators in Texas history to have voted for a major tax cut in every session in which she served. Button also passed a large pay increase for teachers, librarians, counselors, and school nurses.

Button is currently the chair of the House Committee on International Relations and Economic Development and serves as a member of the Ways and Means Committee.

She passed legislation to better inform women who recently gave birth to assist in them receiving the proper follow-up care and has authored legislation to improve access to quality child care.

Reelection

Button defeated Democratic challenger Brandy K. Chambers in 2018 and again in 2020 to win a seventh term.

See also
 History of Chinese Americans in Dallas–Fort Worth

References

1954 births
Living people
Politicians from Taipei
People from Richardson, Texas
People from Garland, Texas
Republican Party members of the Texas House of Representatives
Women state legislators in Texas
American politicians of Taiwanese descent
American women of Taiwanese descent in politics
Asian-American people in Texas politics
American accountants
Women accountants
Businesspeople from Texas
University of Texas at Dallas alumni
Taiwanese emigrants to the United States
21st-century American politicians
21st-century American women politicians
Asian conservatism in the United States